Seo Hee-ju (born November 18, 1993) is a wushu taolu athlete from South Korea. She is a four-time medalist at the World Wushu Championships and a two-time world champion. She also won the bronze medal in women's jianshu and qiangshu at the 2014 Asian Games in Incheon. During training a day before she competed at the 2018 Asian Games, she injured her knee and had to withdraw from the competition.

See also 

 List of Asian Games medalists in wushu

References

External links 
Athlete profile at the 2018 Asian Games
Athlete profile at the 2017 Summer Universiade

1992 births
Living people
South Korean wushu practitioners
Asian Games bronze medalists for South Korea
Asian Games medalists in wushu
Medalists at the 2014 Asian Games
Wushu practitioners at the 2010 Asian Games
Wushu practitioners at the 2014 Asian Games
Wushu practitioners at the 2018 Asian Games
Universiade silver medalists for South Korea
Medalists at the 2017 Summer Universiade
Competitors at the 2022 World Games
World Games silver medalists
World Games medalists in wushu
20th-century South Korean women
21st-century South Korean women